Kosovo has competed in the European Championships since the inaugural event in 2018.

Medal count

See also
Kosovo at the Olympics
Kosovo at the Youth Olympics
Kosovo at the European Games
Kosovo at the Mediterranean Games
Kosovo at the Universiade
Sport in Kosovo

References

Kosovo at multi-sport events